Sameer Reddy is an Indian film cinematographer who works in Telugu and Hindi films, and Cinema of the United States. He is the cousin and a relative of noted cinematographers, Rasool Ellore and S. Gopal Reddy, respectively.

Filmography

References

Hindi film cinematographers
Living people
Telugu film cinematographers
Year of birth missing (living people)